The temporary capital of Lithuania was the official designation of the city of Kaunas in Lithuania during the interwar period. It was in contrast to the declared capital in Vilnius, which was part of Poland from 1920 until 1939. Currently, the term temporary capital, despite having lost its meaning, is still frequently used as a nickname for Kaunas, the second largest city in Lithuania.

History

Vilnius under Polish rule

During World War I, Lithuania declared independence on February 16, 1918. The declaration stated that Lithuania would be a democratic republic with Vilnius as its capital. This claim was based on historical grounds, as the city was founded by Lithuanians and later was the capital of the Grand Duchy of Lithuania. However, the city was multi-ethnic and other groups laid similar claims. Belarusians saw it as the capital of the Belarusian nation and laid claims to the heritage of the former Grand Duchy; Jews saw it as the capital of Yiddish culture; Poles saw it as a Polish-inhabited city.

As Soviet forces pushed westward to spread the global proletarian revolution, German Ober-Ost administration evacuated and the Lithuanians withdrew to Kaunas. Vilnius was captured by the Red Army on January 5, 1919. During the Polish–Soviet War the city changed hands frequently: on April 19, 1919, the city was seized by the regular Polish Army; on July 14, 1920, it was recaptured by Soviet forces. After the Soviet defeat in the Battle of Warsaw, Vilnius was handed to the Lithuanian authorities according to the Soviet–Lithuanian Peace Treaty of July 12, 1920. Poland continued to claim the city and organized Żeligowski's Mutiny to capture it in October 1920. Polish General Żeligowski established the Republic of Central Lithuania, which was incorporated into Poland in 1922. Such situation remained until 1939. In October 1939 the Soviets transferred the city, which they captured during the invasion of Poland, to Lithuania according to the Soviet–Lithuanian Mutual Assistance Treaty. Since then Vilnius has been the capital of the Lithuanian SSR and then independent Lithuania.

Temporary capital in Kaunas
Lithuania refused to have diplomatic relations between Poland and Lithuania until the ultimatum of 1938. Railroad traffic, telegraph lines or even mail could not cross the Polish–Lithuanian border. Lithuania continued to declare Vilnius as its capital in all official documents, including the constitution. Since the city was controlled by Poland, all Lithuanian authorities were transferred to the city of Kaunas, which became the seat of the government. To reconcile reality with constitutional claims, Kaunas was designated as a temporary or provisional capital until Vilnius would be "liberated from Polish occupation". In March 1938, Lithuania accepted a Polish ultimatum, demanding diplomatic relations. Despite normalised relations, the new Lithuanian Constitution, in May 1938, still claimed Vilnius as the de jure capital of Lithuania, and Kaunas remained as the temporary capital.

See also
 History of Lithuania
 History of Vilnius

History of Lithuania (1918–1940)
History of Kaunas
Former national capitals